Sidi Bou Abid Mosque is a mosque overlooking the Grand Socco medina area of central Tangier, Morocco from the southwest. It was built in 1917 and is decorated in polychrome tiles. Near Bab Fahs, a double gateway leading into the medina are the Mendoubia Gardens.

See also
 Mohammed V Mosque, Tangier
 Lalla Abla Mosque
 List of mosques in Morocco

References

Mosques in Tangier
Mosques completed in 1917
20th-century mosques
Tourist attractions in Tangier
20th-century architecture in Morocco